Cotahuasi District is one of eleven districts of the province La Unión in Peru.

Cotahuasi  is located at the highest Andean  point of the department of Arequipa, in southern Peruvian. This province is characterized by its steep relief: cut here and as far back as rivers and gullies, with an altitude that ranges between 1,000 and 6,093 meters above sea level, with 19 different ecosystems. Its customs and traditions have been preserved partly on account of its relative isolation, something that has not happened in neighboring villages (REF).

See also 
 Cotahuasi Subbasin Landscape Reserve
 Saraqutu
 Sulimana
 Wiñaw

References